John Oren Reed (1856 – January 22, 1916) was an American physicist and university dean.

Biography

Born at New Castle, Indiana, in 1885 he graduated from the University of Michigan, where, after studying at Harvard (1891–1892), he was instructor (1892–1894), assistant professor (1894–1899), junior professor (1899–1905), and professor of physics.

He earned a Ph. D. at Friedrich Schiller University of Jena in Germany in 1897.

He was also dean of the summer session from 1899 to 1908 and of the Department of Literature, Science, and the Arts after 1907, and director of the Physical Laboratory after 1909.

He died in Cleveland, Ohio on January 22, 1916.

Publications

His publications include:

 A Manual of Physical Measurements (1902; third edition, 1912), with K. E. Guthe
 College Physics (1902)
 College Physics (1911)
 High School Physics; with W. D. Henderson

References

External links
 

American educators
American physicists
American textbook writers
American male non-fiction writers
Harvard University alumni
People from New Castle, Indiana
University of Michigan alumni
1856 births
1916 deaths